David Angove (born 7 March 1974) is an English former cricketer who played for Cornwall County Cricket Club. In his only List A appearance he scored 6 runs and took 4 wickets for 65 runs. against Warwickshire in the 1996 NatWest Trophy. This performance was noted by Warwickshire, who immediately picked Angove for their upcoming Second XI fixture against Middlesex.

Angove went on to play 4 matches in the Second XI Championship, two for Warwickshire and two for Essex. The following season, Angove played one game for Worcestershire in the Second XI Limited Overs tournament.

He played 26 Minor Counties Championship games for Cornwall, and also 6 Minor counties trophy games for Cornwall.

References

1974 births
Living people
Cornwall cricketers
English cricketers
Sportspeople from Truro